The Little Flying Bears is an animated television series produced by Zagreb Film and CinéGroupe. It was a Canadian production which originally aired in 1990.

This cartoon helps children realize the importance of protecting the environment. The series shows the harmful effects of pollution and fires as well as the important role of the ecosystem.

Plot
The series focuses on a rare species of little bears with wings that live in the magical forest in a utopian cooperative community. The little flying bears together with their friends, took on themselves the task to defend their forest from pollution. However, their efforts, very often, are disturbed by two weasels, Skulk and Sammy, who strive to pollute the forest. Every so often the weasels receive help from Slink the snake. The three always strive to find new ways to disturb the harmony of the forest but their plans are destroyed always by the bears. The bears are always attentive to the advice of the old bear, Plato (who is too old to fly) and his friend Ozzy the owl.

Characters

Protagonists
 Plato (voiced by Walter Massey) - A wise old grey colored flying bear that serves as the head of the flying bear community and is the grandfather of all its bear cubs. Plato is too old to have wings and therefore is not capable of flying. The young bears respect him for his wisdom and follow his advice. He is named after the Greek Philosopher of the same name.
 Walt (voiced by Arthur Holden) - A young male blue colored flying bear cub with lighter blue hair and orange wings. He is Tina's boyfriend. He is the possible, but not confirmed, brother of Jason and Josh. He and Tina are the main protagonists of the series and are the bravest members of the flying bear community.
 Tina (voiced by Jessalyn Gilsig) - A young female orange colored flying bear cub with blonde ponytail, blue wings, green necklace and big green flower on the top of her head. She is Walt's girlfriend. She is the possible, but not confirmed, sister of Lotus and Jasmine. She and Walt are the main protagonists of the series and are the bravest members of the flying bear community.
 Josh (voiced by Teddy Lee Dillon) - A young male light brown colored flying bear cub with brown hair and purple wings. He is Jasmine's boyfriend and fraternal twin brother of Jason. He is one of the shyest members of the flying bear community.
 Jasmine (voiced by Pauline Little) - A young female pink colored flying bear cub with orange wings, blue necklace and blue flower crown. She is Josh's girlfriend and identical twin sister of Lotus. She is quite timid, compared to other flying bears.
 Lotus (voiced by Pauline Little) - A young female pink colored flying bear cub with orange wings, blue necklace and green flower crown. Lotus is Jasmine's identical twin sister. She is the possible, but not confirmed, Jason's girlfriend. She is short-tempered, but not as brave as Walt and Tina.
 Jason (voiced by Jeff Lumby & Ian Finlay) - A young male red colored flying bear cub with blonde hair and green wings. He is Josh's fraternal twin brother. He is the possible, but not confirmed, Lotus's boyfriend. He works in local canteen and is short-tempered, but not as brave as Walt and Tina.
 Ozzy (voiced by Rick Jones) - An impatient and nervous male brown owl. A friend of the bears.
 Markus (voiced by Thor Bishopric) - A young male red frog. A friend of the bears.
 Ariana - A young female purple colored spider with visible ears who wears a green bow on her head.
 Rodney - A male brown colored Beaver.
 Frandisema (voiced by Sonja Ball) - A female green colored frog who wears a pink bonnet on her head.
 Sidney - A male white snow owl who lives in the mountains.

Other notable inhabitants of the forest include: blue rabbits, orange squirrels, pink bobcat or lynx, raccoon, skunk and blue and green birds (both males and females of all these species are shown, but most of them remain unnamed).

Antagonists
 Skulk (voiced by Terrence Scammell) - An anthropomorphic weasel who wears a blue vest and an earring. The Little Flying Bears' worst enemy and frenemy. He yearns for "manimal" (human) culture and brings many side effects to the forest.
 Sammy (voiced by A.J. Henderson) - An anthropomorphic and stupid weasel who wears a green shirt with a belt strapped to his waist and a football helmet on his head. He is Skulk's partner and the enemy and frenemy of the Little Flying Bears.
 Slink (voiced by Rick Jones) - The shrewd snake. The only snake in the forest. Often assists Skulk and Sammy and the frenemy of the Little Flying Bears.
 Grizelda (voiced by Kathleen Fee) - A large and evil spider who lives in the terrible forest. She eats creatures smaller than herself is very protective of the syrup trees.
 Spike - A rat who comes from the city along with two rat subordinates.

Humans
 David (voiced by Daniel Brochu) - A friend of the bears. He is Leah's brother.
 Leah - A friend of the bears. She is David's sister.

Episodes (1990-1991)
Keep Out
Attack Of The Scarlet Serpents
The Juice Festival 
Black Cloud
Runaway Truck
Hurray! For Eggs
A Birthday To Remember
The Traps
The Forbidden Flower
The White Rain
The Bears Christmas 
Sore Losers
The White Bear
The Fountain Of Youth
The Monster In The Mountain 
The Great Drought 
The Lumber Barons
The Wood Fairy
The Costume Ball
Hide And Seek 
The Big Sting
The Reluctant Hero
The Virus
Dr. Skulk
A Gift From Space
Sing For The Rain
The First Encounter
The Rats
The River Rescue 
The Storm 
The Rats Revenge
The Outsider
Capture The Sun
Prescription For Pandemonium
Sabotage
The Visitor
Invasion
Power To Spare
Fire Bug

Theme Song
The theme song was composed by Julie Villandré. The lyrics were written by Jean-Pierre Liccioni and sung by voice actress Sonja Ball.

Awards
The Little Flying Bears had won the coveted first prize for best animated children's series for 1990 at the FIMAJ International Festival in France.

Global broadcasting
The Little Flying Bears has also been screened overseas in several countries including:
 Canada
 New Zealand
 Philippines
 Sweden
 Hungary
 China
 Italy
 South Africa
 United States
 Iceland
 Serbia
 Ghana
 Czechoslovakia
 Brunei
 India
 Macau
 Singapore
 France
 Russia
 Namibia
 Israel
 Poland
 Norway
 Malaysia
 Slovenia
 Croatia
 Bosnia and Herzegovina
 Germany
 Spain
 Indonesia
 North Macedonia
 Arab League

Alternative titles
環保小飛熊 (Traditional Chinese title)
环保小飞熊 (Simplified Chinese title)
Мали летећи медведићи (Mali leteći medvedići) (Serbian title)
Les Oursons Volants (French title)
Die Flugbärchen kommen! (German title)
Repülő bocsok (Hungarian title)
המעופפים הנועזים (HaMeofefim Hanoazim) (Israeli title)
Gli orsetti volanti (Italian title)
Летечките мечиња (Letechkite mechinja) (Macedonian title)
Latające misie (Polish title)
Mali leteči medvedki (Slovene title)
Los Osos Voladores (Spanish title)
De flygande björnarna (Swedish title)
Malí létající medvídci (Czech title)
الدببة الطائرة (Addibaba attaïra) (Arabic title)
De flyvende bjørnene (Norwegian title)
Flugbangsanir (Icelandic title)
Летающие медвежата: Защитники природы (Letayushchie medvezhata: Zashchitniki prirody) (Russian title)

External links
The Little Flying Bears Czech fan webpage
The Little Flying Bears English fan webpage

Canadian children's animated adventure television series
Croatian animated television series
1990s Canadian animated television series
1990 Croatian television series debuts
1991 Croatian television series endings
1990s Croatian television series
Croatian children's television series
Television shows filmed in Montreal
Family Channel (Canadian TV network) original programming
Zagreb Film films
Animated television series about bears